Cathaleen's Fall hydroelectric power station is a hydroelectric plant located on the River Erne at Ballyshannon in County Donegal, Ireland. It is owned and operated by the ESB Group.  The plant is also known as Ballyshannon.

Construction
Plans to dam the Erne for power had been considered in the 1920s, but it was not until 1946 that construction of dams started at two locations on the river between Belleek and Ballyshannon. Cathaleen's Fall was the larger and more downriver of the two.

Construction of the reinforced concrete gravity dam started in 1946 and was complete in 1955. Concrete is used throughout the construction and the generating station is constructed in the modernist style with curved cantilevered stairs and a glass roofed atrium.

Generating capacity
The first turbine was commissioned in 1951 and the second in 1952. The turbines, manufactured by KMW, spin at 187.5 r.p.m. and feed the grid at 110kV via their own 10.5kVA ASEA generators. The average output for the station is 206 GWh a year.

Environmental impact
The construction of the plant had a major impact on the local beauty spot Assaroe Falls. The salmon run at the Falls was described by Richard Twiss in 1775 as "a scene of such a singular nature, as is not to be found elsewhere, and is as unique to Ireland as bullfights are to Spain." This was lost when the dam was constructed. It also required the destruction of a late seventeenth-century bridge, a number of nearby country houses including Camlin Castle, Stonewold, Laputa and Cliff House and a number of other dwellings. Nevertheless, there was no significant local or national resistance to the project at the time.

The plant has a fish pass to allow salmon runs and a hatchery that produces 500,000 smolts a year, mainly to stock the river. About 4 million elvers are also trapped here to improve eel stocks in the catchment area.

Political significance
The construction of the plant is important politically as it was the first act of major co-operation between Northern Ireland and Ireland since the latter's independence. Although there was some discussion in the government in the north about the project, joint interest in draining the Erne predates the scheme and subsequent co-operation has been remarkably free from political difficulties.

The Weir
The site has been used by producers of Conor McPherson's The Weir, with the weir at Cathaleen's Fall representing the fictional location in the play.

References

Hydroelectric power stations in the Republic of Ireland
Gravity dams